The New Clown is a 1916 British silent comedy film directed by Fred Paul and starring James Welch, Manora Thew and Richard Lindsay. It was based on a play by H. M. Paull. The screenplay concerns an aristocrat who runs away to join the circus.

Plot summary
After mistakenly believing he has killed a man, an aristocrat runs away to join the circus where he enjoys a series of comic adventures.

Cast
 James Welch - Lord Cyril Garston 
 Manora Thew - Rosie Dixon 
 Richard Lindsay - Captain Trent 
 Tom Coventry - Tom Baker 
 Brian Daly - Pennyquick 
 E.C. Arundell - Strong Man 
 Kathleen Blake - Maud Chesterton 
 Marjory Day - Winnie Chesterton 
 Edward Sass - Showman 
 Arthur Milton - Innkeeper 
 Fred Rains - Clown

References

External links
 

1916 films
British comedy films
British silent feature films
Films directed by Fred Paul
Ideal Film Company films
British black-and-white films
1916 comedy films
1910s English-language films
1910s British films
Silent comedy films